Verschaffeltia splendida ("Latanier Latte" or stilt palm) is a species of flowering plant in the family Arecaceae. It is the only species in the genus Verschaffeltia.

It is found only in Seychelles where it is threatened by habitat loss.
The name comes from the Belgian Ambroise Verschaffelt.

Description
This species can be distinguished from all other palm species of the Seychelles, by its characteristic stilt-roots.

The slender trunk has a very hard outer covering. The leaves are initially unbroken, and those of the young plants have black spines on their stalks. They bear green-brown fruits with unique seeds.

References

Verschaffeltiinae
Trees of Seychelles
Conservation dependent plants
Endemic flora of Seychelles
Monotypic Arecaceae genera
Taxonomy articles created by Polbot